Baunogenasraid is an archaeological site and National Monument in County Carlow. The site was excavated in 1972 and discovered to contain a single neolithic burial mound which was expanded into a small cemetery in the early Bronze Age.

Location

Baunogenasraid is located north of the Burren River.

References

Notes

Sources

Archaeological sites in County Carlow
National Monuments in County Carlow